A white tiger is a tiger with a genetic condition affecting its pelt's pigmentation.

White tiger, White Tiger or The White Tiger may also refer to:

Arts, entertainment, and media

Characters
 White Tiger (comics), various Marvel Comics superheroes, including:
 White Tiger (Hector Ayala), the first to use the name
 White Tiger (Heroes for Hire), second
 White Tiger (Kasper Cole), third
 White Tiger (Angela del Toro), fourth
 White Tiger (Ava Ayala), fifth
 White Tigers (Beyblade), a team in the anime Beyblade

Film and TV
 White Tiger (1923 film), a 1923 film directed by Tod Browning
 White Tiger (1996 film), a 1996 film directed by Richard Martin
 White Tiger (2012 film), a 2012 Russian WWII film
 The White Tiger (2021 film), a 2021 Netflix film
 Grambling's White Tiger, a US TV movie made in 1981, released as White Tiger in Europe

Literature
 The White Tiger (Nathan novel), a 1987 novel by Robert Stuart Nathan
 White Tiger, a 2006 novel by Kylie Chan
 The White Tiger (Adiga novel), a 2008 novel by Aravind Adiga
 The White Tyger, the third novel in Paul Park's A Princess of Romania series

Music
 White Tiger (band), an American glam metal band
 "White Tiger" (song), a 2015 song by Izzy Bizu

Biology
 White tiger (butterfly), the tiger butterfly species Danaus melanippus
 White tiger (moth), the moth species Nyctemera coleta

Other
 White Tiger (mythology), one of the Four Symbols in Chinese astrology and astronomy
 White Tiger oil field, in the South China Sea
 White Tigers (Korean War), guerrilla training unit of the United States Army
 White Tigers (gang), a former street gang in New York City

See also
 HC Bílí Tygři Liberec, Czech ice-hockey club also known as Liberec White Tigers Hockey Club
 United Nations Partisan Infantry Korea, a US Army unit in the Korean war also known as the White Tigers
 Tigatron, a fictional character from the Transformers universe, who transforms into a white tiger
 White Tiger Ranger in Power Rangers Wild Force
 Tommy Oliver, the White Ranger from Mighty Morphin Power Rangers, who is based on a white tiger